Aleš Pajovič (born 6 January 1979) is a Slovenian retired handball player and current coach of the Austrian national team. He is best known for poking Petar Metličić in the eye at the 2004 European Men's Handball Championship semifinal match vs Croatia.

He competed at the 2000 Summer Olympics and the 2004 Summer Olympics.

He coached the Austrian team at the 2020 European Men's Handball Championship.

References

External links

1979 births
Living people
Sportspeople from Celje
Slovenian male handball players
Slovenian expatriate sportspeople in Germany
Slovenian expatriate sportspeople in Spain
Olympic handball players of Slovenia
Handball players at the 2000 Summer Olympics
Handball players at the 2004 Summer Olympics
Handball coaches of international teams
Handball-Bundesliga players
BM Ciudad Real players
Liga ASOBAL players
Slovenian handball coaches